Arthur Henry "Sarsfield" Ward (15 February 1883 – 1 June 1959), better known as Sax Rohmer, was an English novelist. He is best remembered for his series of novels featuring the master criminal Dr. Fu Manchu.

Life and work 
Born in Birmingham to working class Irish parents William Ward (c. 1850–1932), a clerk, and Margaret Mary (née Furey; c. 1850–1901), Arthur Ward initially pursued a career as a civil servant before concentrating on writing full-time. He worked as a poet, songwriter and comedy sketch writer for music hall performers before creating the Sax Rohmer persona and pursuing a career writing fiction. 

Like his contemporaries Algernon Blackwood and Arthur Machen, Rohmer claimed membership to one of the factions of the qabbalistic Hermetic Order of the Golden Dawn. Rohmer also claimed ties to the Rosicrucians, but the validity of his claims has been questioned. His doctor and family friend Dr R. Watson Councell may have been his only legitimate connection to such organisations. 

His first published work was issued in 1903, when the short story "The Mysterious Mummy" was sold to Pearson's Weekly. Rohmer's main literary influences seem to have been Edgar Allan Poe, Arthur Conan Doyle and M. P. Shiel. He gradually transitioned from writing for music hall performers to concentrating on short stories and serials for magazine publication. In 1909 he married Rose Elizabeth Knox.

He published his first book Pause! anonymously in 1910.

In 1934, Sax Rohmer moved into a newly refurbished house, Little Gatton in Gatton Road, Reigate, Surrey, where he lived until 1946.

He died after succumbing to Asian flu in 1959.

The Fu Manchu series 
After penning Little Tich in 1911 (as ghostwriter for the music hall entertainer of the same name) he wrote the first Fu Manchu novel, The Mystery of Dr. Fu-Manchu, first published in a serialisation from October 1912 to June 1913. It was an immediate success, with its story of Denis Nayland Smith and Dr. Petrie facing the supposed worldwide conspiracy of the "Yellow Peril". The Fu Manchu stories, together with his more conventional detective series characters—Paul Harley, Gaston Max, Red Kerry, Morris Klaw (an occult detective), and the Crime Magnet—made Rohmer one of the most successful and financially successful authors of the 1920s and 1930s.

The first three Fu Manchu books were published in the four years between 1913 and 1917; but it was not until 1931 (some 14 years after the third book in the series) that Rohmer returned to the series with Daughter of Fu Manchu. The reason for the long interval was that Rohmer wanted to be rid of the series after The Si-Fan Mysteries. The first three books had been successfully filmed by Stoll in the twenties as a pair of serials. 

Rohmer's first effort at reviving the Fu Manchu property was ultimately reworked as The Emperor of America. The original intent had been for the head of the organisation to be Fu Manchu's daughter. He kept Head Centre as a female criminal mastermind to combat Drake Roscoe, but was very unhappy with the book both as it started and in its finished form. He would later return to Drake Roscoe and his female supervillain for the Sumuru series. In the meantime, he tried again to focus his energies on what was first titled Fu Manchu's Daughter for Collier's in 1930, but with an older (now knighted) Denis Nayland Smith as the protagonist once more. The results were infinitely better and jump-started the series in the process.

In the 28 years from 1931 to 1959, Rohmer added a further 10 books to the Fu Manchu series, meaning the series totals 13 books in all (not counting the posthumous short story collection The Wrath of Fu Manchu and Other Stories). The Fu Manchu series was criticised by the Chinese government and Chinese communities in the U.S. for what was perceived as negative ethnic stereotyping. Sociologist Virginia Berridge has stated that Rohmer created a false image of London's Chinese community as crime-ridden, further claiming that the Limehouse Chinese were one of the most law-abiding of London's ethnic minorities. Critic Jack Adrian has written: "Rohmer's own racism was careless and casual, a mere symptom of his times". Colin Watson commented: "So vehement and repetitive were Sax Rohmer's references to Asiatic plotting against 'white' civilisation that they cannot be explained simply as the frills of melodramatic narration."

Other work 
Rohmer became a friend of escapologist Harry Houdini, who wrote to him in praise of Rohmer's The Romance of Sorcery. Rohmer based his mystery-solving magician character Bazarada on Houdini.

The Orchard of Tears is an odd book in the context of Sax Rohmer's other work. There are no Oriental villains or exotic locations; rather, there are gentle rabbits and lambs in pastoral settings and a great deal of philosophical musing. As much as he enjoyed Fu Manchu—and the notoriety and income the character provided—Rohmer had other interests and a markedly serious side. The departure from his expected subject matter is plainly signalled by the book's dedication: "To the slaves of the pomegranate, sons of Adam and daughters of Eve, who drink at the fountain of life, this chalice is offered as a loving-cup".

In The Quest of the Sacred Slipper (1919) terror comes to Britain when a self-centered archaeologist unearths one of Islam's holiest relics—the sacred slipper of the prophet Mohammed. Until it is returned to its rightful people, the implacable Hassan of Aleppo vows his reign of death and destruction shall not cease. Behind these inhuman outrages is a secret group of fanatics. Not even the best men of Scotland Yard seem able to apprehend them. 

Tales of Chinatown (1922) is a collection of 10 short stories published in hardcover by Cassell in 1922 and Doubleday, Page and Company in 1922. All of the stories first appeared in magazine format. This collection includes a story that is considered to be one of his best and also has been anthologised many times; "Tcheriapin". The story "The Hand of the Mandarin Quong" was rewritten for this book; first published as "Hand of the White Sheikh", Rohmer changed the setting to a Chinatown background and published it as "The Mystery of the Shriveled Hand"; the title was then changed again for this collection.

Rohmer also wrote several novels of supernatural horror, including Brood of the Witch-Queen, described by Adrian as "Rohmer's masterpiece". Rohmer was very poor at managing his wealth, however, and made several disastrous business decisions that hampered him throughout his career.

His final success came with a 1946–1949 BBC Light Programme radio series that led to a series of 1950s novels featuring a female variation on Fu Manchu, Sumuru. The Sumuru series consists of five books.  Two films featuring the character played by Shirley Eaton were also produced by Harry Alan Towers as was a 2003 German film Sumuru.

Rohmer also wrote numerous short stories; "The Master of Hollow Grange" (1920) is a homage to M. R. James' story "Lost Hearts", featuring a mad scientist who preys on children.

Rohmer's work was banned in Nazi Germany, causing Rohmer to complain that he could not understand such censorship, stating "my stories are not inimical to Nazi ideals".

After World War II, Rohmer and his wife moved to New York, only returning to London shortly before his death. He died in 1959 at the age of 76, due to an outbreak of "Asian flu".

His wife, Rose Elizabeth (Knox) Ward (1886–1979), published her own mystery novel, Bianca in Black, in 1958 under the pen name Elizabeth Sax Rohmer. Some editions of the book mistakenly credit her as Rohmer's daughter. She and Cay Van Ash (1918–1994), her husband's former assistant, wrote a biography of the author, Master of Villainy: A Biography of Sax Rohmer, published in 1972.

Works 
For Rohmer's bibliography, see his full list of work.

Related works:
Bianca in Black by Elizabeth Sax Rohmer, 1958
Master of Villainy: A Biography of Sax Rohmer by Elizabeth Sax Rohmer and Cay Van Ash with Robert Briney, 1972
Ten Years Beyond Baker Street: Sherlock Holmes Matches Wits with the Diabolical Dr. Fu Manchu by Cay Van Ash, 1984. Authorised by the literary estates of Sir Arthur Conan Doyle and Sax Rohmer.
The Fires of Fu Manchu by Cay Van Ash, 1987. Authorised by the Sax Rohmer literary estate.
The Terror of Fu Manchu by William Patrick Maynard, 2009. Authorised by the Rohmer estate.
The Destiny of Fu Manchu by William Patrick Maynard, 2012. Authorised by the Rohmer estate.
The Triumph of Fu Manchu by William Patrick Maynard (announced). Authorised by the Rohmer estate.

A note on texts: U.S. editions of the Sumuru books (Gold Medal/Fawcett paperbacks) have texts which were frequently corrupted.

References

Further reading 
Baker, Phil, & Antony Clayton. Lord of Strange Deaths. London, U.K.: Strange Attractor Press, 2015. 17 scholars and writers contribute well-researched articles on important aspects of Sax Rohmer's writings and the attitudes that they display, with notable contributions by Robert Irwin, Gary Lachman, and Lawrence Knapp, among others.
Briney, Robert E. "Chronological Bibliography of the Works of Sax Rohmer". In Francis M. Nevins (ed), The Mystery Writer's Art, London: Tom Stacey, 1971, as an appendix to "Sax Rohmer: An Informal Survey" by Briney. A slightly altered version of the checklist appears in Master of Villainy – see Van Ash and Rohmer below.
Colombo, John Robert. "Sax Rohmer and His Yellow Shadows", The Tamarack Review journal (Autumn 1960), No. 17, pp. 43–57. This essay discusses the man and his accomplishment the year following his death.
Colombo, John Robert. A Sax Rohmer Miscellany. Toronto, Colombo & Company, 2014. This 166-page monograph collects and presents unusual biographical and critical information about Rohmer and his literary creations. Included is a hitherto unpublished letter from Rohmer to Colombo.
Coombs, Alistair. "Sinister Shades in Yellow" Starfire Vol. II, No. 3, 2008. Essay discusses occult influences in themes from Rohmer's novels with bearing on Theosophy, Kenneth Grant and H.P. Lovecraft.
Day, Bradford M. Sax Rohmer: A Bibliography Denver, NY: Science Fiction and Fantasy Publications, 1963. Includes information on book editions and magazine appeararances. Reprinted by Bradford M. Day, Bibliography of Adventure NY: Arno Press, 1978 (the reprint is slightly revised, but is not updated beyond 1963). Both versions have some inaccuracies, but are useful for the listings on Rohmer's magazine appearances.
Enright, D.J. "Introduction" to The Mystery of Dr. Fu Manchu. London: Everyman, 1985. Overview of the Fu Manchu work.
Frayling, Christopher. The Yellow Peril: Dr. Fu Manchu & The Rise of Chinaphobia. New York: Thames & Hudson, 2014. This is a highly readable, extremely well-informed, and very comprehensive study of Orientalism with special reference to Sax Rohmer's contribution, with 60 illustrations, more than half of them in color.
Huang, Yunte. Charlie Chan: The Untold Story of the Honorable Detective and His Rendezvous with American History. New York: W.W. Norton & Company, 2010. Chapter 15 ("Fu Manchu"), pp. 136–44, considers the Yellow Peril. Chapter 28 ("The Fu Manchurian Candidate"), pp. 268–77, traces the influence of Rohmer's President Fu Manchu on Richard Condon's influential novel The Manchurian Candidate.
Lane, Andrew. "The Crimes of Fu Manchu". Million magazine (May–June 1991), pp. 41–44. Overview, with a useful "Fu Manchu Chronology".
Mayer, Ruth. Serial Fu Manchu: The Chinese Supervillain and the Spread of Yellow Peril Ideology. Philadelphia: Temple University Press, 2014. In this academic study, the author considers the "yellow peril imagination" alongside the "Fu Manchu narratives" with respect to their "seriality" (including the depiction of stock figures rather than credible characters) and demonstrates that the fictional story is far from being fully told.
Scapperotti, Dan. "Memories of Fu Manchu". Starlog (Jan. 1987), pp. 60–64.  Article about Henry Brandon, the actor who played Fu Manchu in the Republic Pictures serial Drums of Fu Manchu.
Scott, David. "Rohmer's 'Orient' – Pulp Orientalism?" Orient Archive (#80), 2012, pp. 1–27. A comprehensive consideration of Rohmer's descriptions of Egypt and the Egyptians and China and the Chinese, with special references to women, jihad and conspiracy, in light of the notion of "the other".
Cay Van Ash and Elizabeth Sax Rohmer. Master of Villainy: A Biography of Sax Rohmer, London: Tom Stacey, 1972. The only full-length biography.  Originally intended as a collaboration by Rohmer and his wife, the book draws on a series of articles titled "Pipe Dreams" written by Rohmer as early as 1918, as well as anecdotes and memories of Rohmer's wife. Robert E. Briney annotated the text. Includes Robert E. Briney, "Chronological Bibliography of the Books of Sax Rohmer" (see pp. 299–305), which supersedes that of Day in Bibliography of Adventure (1970)

External links 

 
 
 
 
 
 

1883 births
1959 deaths
20th-century English novelists
20th-century British short story writers
Burials at St Mary's Catholic Cemetery, Kensal Green
English crime fiction writers
English Roman Catholics
English people of Irish descent
English horror writers
English male novelists
English thriller writers
Writers from Birmingham, West Midlands
20th-century English male writers
20th-century pseudonymous writers
Deaths from influenza